Anđelka Bego-Šimunić (23 October 1941 – 9 February 2022) was a Bosnian-Herzegovinian composer of Croatian descent. She taught at the Sarajevo Music Academy in Sarajevo, Bosnia and Herzegovina.

She studied composition at the academy under Ivan Brkanović and Miroslav Špiler, earning a master's degree in 1973. Afterwards, she taught theory at the secondary music school in Sarajevo. She joined the staff of the academy in 1975, and later became assistant (1985) and full professor at the academy, where her students include Igor Karaca. From 1986 to 1992 she was president of the Bosnian composers’ association (1986–1992) and one of the principal organizers of the Days of Musical Creation festival.

Her music is mostly neo-classical in style, influenced by Sergei Prokofiev's extended tonality and treatment of form, with elements of neo-romanticism, particularly in the style of Franz Liszt, and early Expressionism. Her works occasionally refer to Bosnian folklore.

References

External links 
 

1941 births
2022 deaths
Women composers
Croats of Bosnia and Herzegovina
Bosnia and Herzegovina composers